The Bullet Galaxy (RXC J2359.3-6042 CC) is a galaxy in the galaxy cluster RXC J2359.3-6042 (Abell 4067 or ACO 4067). The Bullet Galaxy is the sole component of one half of a cluster merger between the bulk of the cluster and this galaxy, which is plowing through the cluster, similar to how merging clusters Bullet Cluster and Bullet Group have merged. Unlike those two mergers, the Bullet Galaxy's merger is between one galaxy and a galaxy cluster. The cluster merger is happening at a lower speed than the Bullet Cluster, thus allowing the core of the Bullet Galaxy to retain cool gas and remain relatively undisturbed by its passage through the larger cluster. This cluster merger is the first one observed between a single galaxy and a cluster.

By studying this unique merging researchers can gain insight on dark matter, and how it interacts with other objects in space. According to astrophysicists James Bullock, "Galaxy clusters that are merging with each other represent interesting laboratories for this kind of question,” when he was speaking of dark matter and the Bullet cluster.

Bullet Cluster 

The Bullet Cluster (1E 0657-558) consists of two colliding clusters of galaxies. Strictly speaking, the name Bullet Cluster refers to the smaller sub cluster, moving away from the larger one. It is at a co-moving radial distance of 1.141 Gpc (3.7 billion light-years). Gravitational lensing studies of the Bullet Cluster are claimed to provide the best evidence to date for the existence of dark matter. Observations of other galaxy cluster collisions, such as MACS J0025.4-1222, are similarly claimed to support the existence of dark matter.

References 

Galaxies
Tucana (constellation)